Curcuma petiolata (also known as jewel of Thailand, Siam tulip, hidden ginger, pastel hidden ginger, hidden lily or queen lily) is a plant of the Zingiberaceae or ginger family.

It is native to Thailand, Myanmar, Laos and Java.

Average height . Flowers cone-shaped, golden-yellow, pink, white or purple. Blooms June–August. Fertile bracts green, coma bracts pinkish white.

Pests include mealybugs.

It is widely cultivated as an ornamental plant for its beautiful flowers. 'Emperor' selection is grown for its attractive variegated foliage as well as its flowers.

Synonyms include Curcuma cordata Wall. and the nomen nudum Curcuma cordifolia Roxb.

References

External links 

petiolata
Flora of Thailand
Flora of Myanmar
Flora of Laos
Flora of Java
Plants described in 1820